The 2015–16 season was Empoli Football Club's second consecutive season in Serie A after their promotion from Serie B at the end of the 2013–14 season. Having finished 15th the previous season, Empoli is competing only in domestic competition, in both Serie A and the Coppa Italia.

Empoli's pre-season began with the departure of manager Maurizio Sarri to Napoli.

Players
.

Squad information

Transfers

In

Loans in

Out

Loans out

Competitions

Serie A

League table

Results summary

Results by round

Matches

Coppa Italia

Statistics

Appearances and goals

|-
! colspan="14" style="background:#dcdcdc; text-align:center"| Goalkeepers

|-
! colspan="14" style="background:#dcdcdc; text-align:center"| Defenders

|-
! colspan="14" style="background:#dcdcdc; text-align:center"| Midfielders

|-
! colspan="14" style="background:#dcdcdc; text-align:center"| Forwards

|-
! colspan="14" style="background:#dcdcdc; text-align:center"| Players transferred out during the season

Goalscorers

Last updated: 15 May 2016

Clean sheets

Last updated: 1 May 2016

References

Empoli F.C. seasons
Empoli